Mahlsdorf is a locality (Ortsteil) within the Berlin borough (Bezirk) of Marzahn-Hellersdorf. Until 2001 it was part of the former borough of Hellersdorf.

History
The locality was mentioned for the first time in a document of 1345, named as Malterstorp. Until 1920 it was a municipality of the former Niederbarnim district, merged into Berlin with the "Greater Berlin Act".

Geography

Overview
Mahlsdorf is located in the eastern suburb of Berlin, at the borders with the Brandenburger district of Märkisch-Oderland. It is bounded by the municipality of Neuenhagen and Hoppegarten, with its hamlets Hönow, Waldesruh and Birkenstein. The Berliner bordering localities are Hellersdorf, Kaulsdorf and Köpenick (in Treptow-Köpenick district). In the south of the quarter there are the lakes Elsensee and part of the Habermannsee, divided with Kaulsdorf.

Subdivision
Mahlsdorf is divided into 2 zones (Ortslagen):
Mahlsdorf-Nord
Mahlsdorf-Süd

Transport
The locality, crossed by the federal highways B1 and B5, is served by the S-Bahn line S5, at the rail station of Mahlsdorf. Birkenstein station, situated in the homonymous hamlet of the town of Hoppegarten, is close to the eastern suburb of the quarter.

Gallery

Personalities
Gerhard Behrendt (1929–2006)
Ralf Bursy (1956–2022)
Alice Herz (1882–1965)
Charlotte von Mahlsdorf (1928–2002)
Kathrin Schmidt (born 1958)
Kurt Schwaen (1909–2007)
Reiner Süß (1930–2015)
Petra Zieger (born 1959)

References

Literature
Kurt Pomplun: "Berlins alte Dorfkirchen" (page 59). Verlag Bruno Hessling, Berlin 1967

External links

 Mahlsdorf unofficial website
 Mahlsdorf page on info-marzahn-hellersdorf.de

Localities of Berlin